Bulgo Sandstone is a sedimentary rock occurring in the Sydney Basin in eastern Australia. This stratum is up to 100 metres thick, formed in the early Triassic. A component of the Narrabeen Group of sedimentary rocks. It consists of layers of fine to medium-grained quartz-lithic sandstone, with lenticular shale interbeds.

Often seen as a grey-green colour when exposed, the Bulgo sandstone contains a high level of particles of volcanic rocks, and is dissimilar to other Sydney sandstones, such as Hawkesbury sandstone and Newport Formation. The rock breaks down to create a relatively fertile clayey soil. These soils contribute to the rainforest growth in the northern Illawarra. Bulgo sandstone may be seen at the "figure eight" rock pool at Royal National Park and at Long Reef in the northern Beaches in Sydney. A fossil of the giant salamander (Bulgosuchus gargantua) was found at Long Reef.

See also
 Sydney Basin
 Bald Hill Claystone
 Garie Formation
 Narrabeen group

References

Geologic formations of Australia
Triassic Australia
Sandstone formations
Geology of New South Wales